Mohammed Abduba Dida (born 1974) is a Kenyan teacher who vied for the country's presidency in the 2013 General Election on an Alliance of Real Change party ticket. Dida ran again in the 2017 General Election, conceding hours before the election was called in favour of the incumbent; President Uhuru Kenyatta, but at the same time calling into question the integrity of the election and the conduct of the two main political parties; Jubilee and Nasa.

Dida was not well known prior to his presentation of papers to the IEBC. He previously taught English Literature and Religion at Lenana School and Daadab Secondary School at the refugee camp. In 2013, Dida garnered 52,848 votes representing 0.43% of the popular vote.

References

External links
Why Dida ‘President’ was the star

1974 births
Living people
Kenyan Muslims
Kenyatta University alumni
Kenyan people of Somali descent
Alliance for Real Change (Kenya) politicians
People from Wajir County
Candidates for President of Kenya
Kenyan educators